The Sorathia are a sub-group of the Ahir caste found in the state of Gujarat in India.

Origin 

The Sorathiya Ahir is branch of Yaduvanshi Ahirs in Gujarat. The community derives its name from the Sorath region of Saurashtra. The population of Sorathiya Subcaste is in majority in comparison of other branches of Gujarati Ahirs. Sorthiya Ahir has a total of 484 surnames, which is more then any other branches of Gujarati Ahirs. According to their traditions, they migrated from Mathura along with God Shri Krishna. They are now found mainly in Porbandar, Jamnagar, Junagadh, Kutch and other all District of Saurashtra Prant. The Sorathia speak Kutchhi and Gujarati. European supremacist and other slave-minded historians had earlier wrongly attributed the communities origins to Caucasians. These Yaduvanshis have rich cultural history and deep rooted sense of identity carried over in their unique oral traditions.

Present circumstances 
The Sorathia community consist of near about sixty clans. Each of the clans are of equal status and intermarry. Like neighbouring Hindu communities, the community practices clan exogamy. The Sorathia are a community of farmers and landlords; they are involved mainly in transport and heavy construction machinery business. Some of them earn a living as contractors.

See also 
Ahir clans

References 

Ahir
Social groups of Gujarat
Indian castes